Condon Hall can refer to:
Condon Hall (University of Washington)
Condon Hall (University of Oregon)

Architectural disambiguation pages